Nathanaël Berthon (born 1 July 1989  in Romagnat) is a professional racing driver from France.

Career

Karting
Berthon began his international karting career in 2006, with the highlights being a third-place finish in the Copa Campeones Trophy ICA class and fifth in the French Championship Elite category. The following year he again finished fifth in the French Championship Elite class. He also finished eighth in the South Garda Winter Cup KF1 and 13th in the World Cup KF1 categories.

Formula Renault 2.0
In 2008, Berthon moved up to single–seaters, taking part in both the Formula Renault 2.0 West European Cup and Eurocup Formula Renault 2.0 series for Boutsen Energy Racing. In the West European Cup, he finished in the points on four occasions, scoring nine points to be classified in 18th place, whilst in the Eurocup, he failed to score a point, with his best race result being 12th place at the Nürburgring meeting.

2009 saw Berthon remain in both series for a second season, this time racing for the Spanish team Epsilon Euskadi. He won his first Eurocup race at the opening round in Barcelona after teammate Albert Costa was disqualified for a technical infringement. He followed that up with a further podium at the Hungaroring to finish sixth in the standings.

In the West European Cup, Berthon took a victory at Spa–Francorchamps along with six other podium finishes to finish third in the championship, behind Jean-Éric Vergne and champion Costa. He was also crowned as French Formula Renault 2.0 champion, with the series being run as part of the West European Cup season.

Formula Renault 3.5 Series

In October 2009, Berthon sampled a Formula Renault 3.5 Series car for the first time, testing for Tech 1 Racing at Motorland Aragón in Spain as a reward for winning the French Formula Renault 2.0 title. He drove for the recently–crowned champions Draco Racing during the next test at the Circuit de Catalunya and in December 2009 it was announced that he would drive for the team in the 2010 season. He was joined at the team by Colombian driver Omar Leal.

After finishing on the podium at the season–opener in Motorland Aragón and again at Brno, Berthon secured his first Formula Renault 3.5 Series win on home soil at Magny–Cours, holding off a stiff challenge from Tech 1 Racing's Daniel Ricciardo. He followed that up with another podium finish at Hockenheim to be classified in seventh place in the championship standings.

Berthon returned to the series in 2011, replacing Dean Stoneman at ISR Racing after the Briton was forced to pull out of the championship due to illness. Partnered variously by Ricciardo and Lewis Williamson, he took a first finish of third place to finish 13th overall in the drivers' championship.

Formula Three
In July 2010, Berthon made his Formula Three debut, racing for the ART Grand Prix team in the British Formula 3 Championship round at Spa–Francorchamps as an entry in the Invitation class. During the weekend he finished all three races, taking a best result of 13th place in the sprint event.

GP2 Series
Berthon made his debut in the GP2 Asia Series in 2011, partnering Spaniard Dani Clos at the Racing Engineering team. He failed to score a point in the four races he contested and was classified in 23rd place in the championship. He returned to the main GP2 Series, again with Racing Engineering, for the non-championship race that concluded the 2011 season, and raced full-time for the team in 2012, alongside Fabio Leimer, eventually finishing 12th overall with a best race finish of second on two occasions.

Toyota Racing Series
In the winter of 2012 prior to the start of the GP2 season, Berthon travelled to New Zealand to compete in the five-round Toyota Racing Series in a grid which featured a mix of local and foreign drivers. As one of five drivers for the M2 Competition team, he finished seventh in the championship.

Formula One
On 16 November 2011, Berthon had his first experience of driving a Formula One car. At the Abu Dhabi young drivers' test at the Yas Marina Circuit, he drove the HRT F1 Team's F111 for nine laps. He set a best time of 1:48.646, which left him 13th fastest. The following day, Berthon had the whole day to himself with the car, completing 51 laps and finished the day in 12th position with a best time of 1:45.839. Berthon described the day by saying:
"Today was a great experience but it felt like it was too short. I would like to spend some more time in the car but, as a first step, it was very good".

Formula E
On 17 October 2015, it was announced that Berthon would partner António Félix da Costa at Team Aguri for the 2015–16 season.

Racing record

Career summary

† As Berthon was a guest driver, he was ineligible for championship points.
* Season still in progress.

Complete Formula Renault 3.5 Series results
(key) (Races in bold indicate pole position) (Races in italics indicate fastest lap)

Complete GP2 Series results
(key) (Races in bold indicate pole position) (Races in italics indicate fastest lap)

 Driver did not finish the race, but was classified as he completed over 90% of the race distance.

Complete GP2 Asia Series results
(key) (Races in bold indicate pole position) (Races in italics indicate fastest lap)

Complete GP2 Final results
(key) (Races in bold indicate pole position) (Races in italics indicate fastest lap)

Complete 24 Hours of Le Mans results

Complete FIA World Endurance Championship results

Complete Formula Acceleration 1 results
(key) (Races in bold indicate pole position) (Races in italics indicate fastest lap)

Complete European Le Mans Series results

Complete Formula E results
(key) (Races in bold indicate pole position; races in italics indicate fastest lap)

Complete World Touring Car Cup results
(key) (Races in bold indicate pole position) (Races in italics indicate fastest lap)

* Season still in progress.

Complete TCR Europe Touring Car Series results
(key) (Races in bold indicate pole position) (Races in italics indicate fastest lap)

References

External links

 
 

1989 births
Living people
Sportspeople from Clermont-Ferrand
French racing drivers
Formula Renault Eurocup drivers
Formula Renault 2.0 WEC drivers
French Formula Renault 2.0 drivers
British Formula Three Championship drivers
World Series Formula V8 3.5 drivers
GP2 Asia Series drivers
Toyota Racing Series drivers
GP2 Series drivers
European Le Mans Series drivers
24 Hours of Le Mans drivers
FIA World Endurance Championship drivers
Formula E drivers
World Touring Car Cup drivers
24H Series drivers
Blancpain Endurance Series drivers
Audi Sport drivers
Epsilon Euskadi drivers
Draco Racing drivers
ART Grand Prix drivers
ISR Racing drivers
Racing Engineering drivers
M2 Competition drivers
Trident Racing drivers
Murphy Prototypes drivers
Kolles Racing drivers
Team Aguri drivers
G-Drive Racing drivers
Greaves Motorsport drivers
W Racing Team drivers
DragonSpeed drivers
Rebellion Racing drivers
Team Lazarus drivers
Karting World Championship drivers
Jota Sport drivers
Comtoyou Racing drivers
Boutsen Ginion Racing drivers
TCR Europe Touring Car Series drivers